= Moon Sung Lee =

South Korean and American taekwondoin (1939–2025)

- Born: 1939; Korea, Empire of Japan
- Died: June 23, 2025 (aged 85–86); New York, United States
- Nationality: Korean-American
- Style: Taekwondo
- Rank: Grandmaster
- Years active: 1972–2025

Other information
- Notable school: Moon S. Lee Taekwondo Institute

Moon Sung Lee (1939 – 2025) was a Korean-American Taekwondo grandmaster, instructor, and founder of the Moon S. Lee Taekwondo Institute in Astoria, New York. He was one of the earliest Taekwondo pioneers in Queens and taught thousands of students over a career spanning more than fifty years. Lee was recognized by the U.S. Taekwondo Grandmasters Society and is widely regarded as one of the foundational figures in the development of Taekwondo in New York City.

== Early Life and Immigration ==
Moon Sung Lee was born in 1939 in Korea, Empire of Japan. He trained in Taekwondo during the formative years of the art before immigrating to the United States, where he later established one of the earliest Taekwondo schools in Queens, New York.

== Career ==
In 1972, Lee founded the Moon S. Lee Taekwondo Institute in Astoria, Queens. The school became one of the longest‑running martial arts institutions in the borough and produced multiple generations of black belts. According to the New York Black Belt Center, Lee’s first student and first black belt was Joseph Lupo Sr., who later became a prominent Taekwondo instructor in his own right.

Lee was listed among the senior advisors and grandmasters recognized by the U.S. Taekwondo Grandmasters Society, a national organization that documents legitimate high‑ranking Taekwondo masters in the United States.

Moon Sung Lee died on June 23, 2025. His death was publicly announced in Tae Kwon Do Life Magazine, which published an obituary honoring his contributions to the martial arts community. Lee is remembered as one of the earliest Taekwondo pioneers in New York City. His school operated for more than five decades, and his students went on to become instructors, school owners, and competitors. His influence continues through the lineage of instructors he trained.
